Drakino may refer to:
Drakino, Republic of Mordovia, a village (selo) in the Republic of Mordovia, Russia
Drakino, Liskinsky District, Voronezh Oblast, a village (selo) in Liskinsky District of Voronezh Oblast, Russia
Drakino, Repyovsky District, Voronezh Oblast, a village (khutor) in Repyovsky District of Voronezh Oblast, Russia
Drakino, name of several other rural localities in Russia
Drakino, name of the village of Molodye Vskhody in the Republic of Mordovia, Russia, until 1940
Staroye Drakino, a village (selo) in the Republic of Mordovia, Russia